The Central African Games was an international multi-sport event for countries within Central Africa. It was held on three occasions: in 1976 in Libreville, Gabon, in 1981 in Luanda, Angola, and finally in 1987 in Brazzaville, People's Republic of the Congo.

History
Between 1962 and 1964, was helds the Jeux de la Coupe des Tropiques. In 1972, a Central African Cup competition had been organised in Brazzaville, featuring a number of sporting events, and this proved to be a precursor to the Central African Games, which was first held four years later.

The first Games were designed as a buildup to the 1976 Summer Olympics, but this proved to be the year's highlight for many of the athletes as many African countries boycotted the Olympics in protest of New Zealand's sporting links with Apartheid-era South Africa.

Events at the final edition of the Games in 1987 acted as qualifiers for the 1987 All-Africa Games in some cases.

Editions

Precedent games

Jeux de la Coupe des Tropiques

Coupe d'Afrique Centrale

Central African Games

Sports

Nations

See also 
 African Games
 South African Games (now defunct)
 West African Games (inactive)

References 

 
African international sports competitions
Sport in Central Africa
Defunct multi-sport events
Multi-sport events in Africa
Recurring sporting events established in 1976
Recurring sporting events disestablished in 1987